The Planggenstock (1,675 m) is a mountain of the Schwyzer Alps, located south of Bilten in the canton of Glarus. It lies between the valley of the Linth and the valley of Niederurnen.

References

External links
Planggenstock on Hikr

Mountains of the Alps
Mountains of Switzerland
Mountains of the canton of Glarus
One-thousanders of Switzerland